Time Traveler is a 1980 fantasy text adventure developed by Krell Software. The game was released on the 16K, Level II TRS-80, Apple II, Commodore PET, and Atari 8-bit family

Plot 

The object of the game is for a player to go back in time and obtain 14 rings, each hidden in a different era and possessing a different special power that can help the player in some way. The player then returns with them to the time machine laboratory.

Reception 

The game was reviewed in The Dragon #44 by Mark Herro. Herro said that his opinion of the game kept changing as he played it; he intended to evaluate the game negatively at first, but the more he played the more he found himself liking it despite its problems. As he was playing an early pre-production advance copy, he found a number of little bugs in the program. Krell Software told him they had taken care of the problems in later versions.

Jon Mishcon reviewed Time Traveler in The Space Gamer No. 39. Mishcon commented that "Overall I'd say this game has some great ideals but fails to give the player enough information so that you can just sit down and enjoy playing. Those who delight in delving into a long game may find this enjoyable. I'd recommend you wait for their next game."

Terry Romine reviewed the game for Computer Gaming World, and stated that "I fear that, after a person develops a strategy, the game will quickly become a series of stale replays. There are no differences between eras other than the name of the era and its political factions."

References

External links 
 Time Traveler emulated on VirtualApple
 Time Traveler on Time Travel Institute
Review in Creative Computing

1980 video games
1980s interactive fiction
Adventure games
Apple II games
Atari 8-bit family games
Commodore PET games
Krell Software games
TRS-80 games
Video games about time travel
Video games developed in the United States